This is a list of famous prisoners of war (POWs) whose imprisonment attracted media attention, or who became well known afterwards.

A
Ron Arad – Israeli fighter pilot, shot down over Lebanon in 1986; not seen since 1988 and is presumed dead
Everett Alvarez, Jr. – Navy aviator, Vietnam War POW, held for 8 years, second longest period as a POW in American history (after Floyd James Thompson)

B
 Douglas Bader – British fighter pilot, Wing commander in Battle of Britain
 Per Bergsland - Norwegian pilot of No. 332 Squadron RAF. Escapee #44 of the "Great Escape" from Stalag Luft III, successfully made it to Sweden with Jens Müller
 Leonard Birchall – the "Saviour of Ceylon"
 Gregory "Pappy" Boyington - US Marine Corps Fighter Ace during WWII, Medal of Honor recipient
 Fernand Braudel – historian, was a POW in WWII
 Frank Buckles – the last surviving American veteran of WWI, was a civilian during WWII when imprisoned by the Japanese
 Roger Bushell - South African-born RAF Squadron Leader. Masterminded the "Great Escape" from Stalag Luft III in 1944, but was one of the 50 escapees to be recaptured and subsequently murdered by the Gestapo.
 Peter Butterworth – actor, Fleet Air Arm officer, shot down 1940, imprisoned in Stalag Luft III
 Hubert Brooks  – Canadian RCAF officer, partisan in Home Army in occupied Poland, awarded Military Cross and the Polish Cross of Merit with Swords

C
 Anthony Chenevix-Trench – future headmaster of Eton, artillery officer, prisoner 1942-45 at Changi Prison and on the Burma Railway
 Winston Churchill – during the Second Boer War; escaped
 James Clavell – prisoner in Singapore, based his novel King Rat on his experiences during WWII
 George Thomas Coker – US Navy aviator, POW in North Vietnam, noted resistor of his captors

D
 Rupert Davies – actor, Fleet Air Arm observer, POW in Stalag Luft III 1940-45
 Charles de Gaulle – French general and political leader, captured at Verdun, POW 1916-1918
 Dieter Dengler – United States Navy pilot who escaped a Pathet Lao prison camp in Laos
 Jeremiah Denton – awarded the Navy Cross for resistance in captivity during the Vietnam War
 Roy Dotrice – British actor
 John A. Dramesi – USAF Colonel, Vietnam POW, lead the only organized escape from the Hanoi Hilton with Edwin Atterberry
 Werner Drechsler – killed by fellow German POWs during WWII for informing on other prisoners
 Sir Edward "Weary" Dunlop –Australian surgeon and legend among prisoners of the Thai Burma Railway in WWII
 Clive Dunn – British Dad's Army actor, captured following the Battle of Greece in 1941 and held in German captivity until the end of WWII
 Yakov Dzhugashvili – Joseph Stalin's first son, captured by Germans early in WWII, lived in Sachsenhausen concentration camp in 1943

E
 Denholm Elliott – British actor

G
 Henri Giraud – French general, escaped German captivity in both WWI and WWII
 Ernest Gordon –POW of Japanese in WWII, author ofThrough the Valley of the Kwai and former Presbyterian Dean of Princeton University chapel

H
James Hargest – New Zealand Brigadier captured in WWII, escaped from captivity into Switzerland
 Heinrich Harrer – Austrian mountaineer, sportsman and author, detained in British India during WWII until he escaped in 1944, described in his Seven Years in Tibet
 Erich Hartmann – "The Blond Knight of Germany", number one air ace of all air forces in WWII
 Jack Hawkins (U.S. Marine Corps officer)
 Rudolf Hess – Deputy Führer of Germany, POW in England 1941-45, before his trial for war crimes
 Bob Hoover – American WWII pilot, test pilot and airshow performer; captured in 1944 and escaped from Stalag Luft I
 Brian Horrocks – British WW2 general, WWI POW in Germany and Russia
 Wilm Hosenfeld – Soviet POW in WWII, most remembered for saving the life of Polish pianist and composer Władysław Szpilman
 William Hull – American Brigadier General who surrendered Fort Detroit to the British at the outbreak of the War of 1812

J
 Andrew Jackson – seventh President of the United States, captured in the American Revolutionary War as a thirteen-year-old courier
 Charles R. Jackson – captured in Battle of Corregidor, as described in memoir I Am Alive: A United States Marine's Story of Survival in a WWII Japanese POW Camp
 Harold K. Johnson – US Army Chief of Staff 1964; captured at Bataan (1942–1945)

K
 Bert Kaempfert – German orchestra conductor in WWII at a Danish POW camp
 Emil Kapaun – Roman Catholic priest in US Army, Medal of Honor recipient, Servant of God candidate for sainthood
 George Kenner – German artist interned as a civilian POW in Great Britain and the Isle of Man during WWI, which he documented in 110 paintings and drawings
 Tikka Khan – Japanese POW during WWII, Chief of Army Staff of the Pakistani Army
 Wajid Khan – Canadian politician, Pakistan-India War 1971 fighter pilot
 Yahya Khan – German POW during WWII, last president of a united Pakistan
 Maximilian Kolbe – Roman Catholic priest from Poland, interned in Auschwitz, and canonized as a saint
 Tadeusz Bór-Komorowski – Commander of the Polish Home Army in the Warsaw Uprising
 Gustav Krist – adventurer and traveler, Austrian soldier in WWI, captured by Russians and Interned in Russian Turkestan
 Sam Kydd – British actor

L
 George Lascelles, 7th Earl of Harewood – captured in Italy 1944, one of the Prominente (celebrity inmates) at Colditz
 Desmond Llewelyn – actor, most famously as Q in the James Bond film series
 Jessica Lynch – American servicewoman during the Iraq war

M
Herbert Massey - RAF Air Commodore. Senior British Officer at Stalag Luft III who authorized the "Great Escape"
Keith Matthew Maupin – captured on April 9, 2004, date of murder unknown, remains found March 30, 2008
Charles Cardwell McCabe – a POW and chaplain at Libby Prison during the American Civil War
John McCain – Republican nominee for president in 2008, POW for over five years in Vietnam
Olivier Messiaen – French composer
George Millar – journalist, British soldier, SOE agent, writer
Dusty Miller – executed for his faith during internment under the Japanese in Thailand in 1945
François Mitterrand – French president, captured during WWII in 1940, escaped 6 times before arriving home in December 1941
 Jens Müller - Norwegian pilot of No. 331 Squadron RAF. Escapee #43 of the "Great Escape" from Stalag Luft III, successfully made it to Sweden with Per Bergsland
W. H. Murray – German POW during WWII, Scottish mountaineer

N
 Airey Neave – British politician, made the first British home run from Colditz on 5 January 1942
 A. A. K. Niazi – commander of Pakistan Army in East Pakistan who surrendered along with nearly 93,000 other soldiers

O
 Richard O'Connor – British General who commanded the Western Desert Force 1940-41

P
 Friedrich Paulus – German field marshal, surrendered Stalingrad to the Soviets in 1943
 Pete Peterson – American diplomat and member of  Congress, Air Force pilot who spent more than six years as a POW in Vietnam
 Donald Pleasence – English film and stage actor, WWII RAF airman shot down and placed in a German POW camp; later acted in the film The Great Escape

R
 John Rarick – U.S. Representative from Louisiana
 Sławomir Rawicz - Polish Army lieutenant who was imprisoned by the Soviets after the German-Soviet invasion of Poland. Ghost-wrote the book "The Long Walk", where he claimed he and six others escaped from a Siberian Gulag camp and trekked on foot through the Gobi Desert, Tibet, and the Himalayas before finally reaching British India.
 Pat Reid – author of historical non-fiction
 James Robinson Risner – USAF Brigadier General, first living recipient of the Air Force Cross
 Yevgeny Rodionov – Russian soldier captured by rebel forces in Chechnya and beheaded for refusing to convert to Islam
 Giles Romilly – nephew of Winston Churchill, war correspondent, Prominente (celebrity prisoner) in Germany 1940-45
 James N. Rowe – Colonel, US Army Special Forces, held by the Viet Cong from 1963 to 1968, one of only 34 American soldiers to escape captivity in Vietnam

S
 Jean-Paul Sartre – French philosopher and writer, POW 1940-1941
 Kazuo Sakamaki – first POW captured by US forces in WWII
 Winfield Scott – American Lt Col who surrendered at the Battle of Queenston Heights; later Commanding General of the United States Army from 1841 to 1861
 Ronald Searle – English cartoonist
 Léopold Senghor – Senegalize writer and political leader, captured 1940 in France
 Gilad Shalit – Israeli soldier captured in 2006 by Hamas, released in a prisoner exchange in 2011
 Vladek Spiegelman – Polish private captured by Germany on first day of WWII, father of Art Spiegelman
 William Stacy – Lieutenant Colonel of the Continental Army, captured during the Cherry Valley massacre; General George Washington made failed attempt to retrieve him via prisoner exchange 
 James Stockdale – candidate for Vice President in 1992; decorated member of the US Navy; POW in Vietnam
 E W Swanton – captured by Japanese in Singapore; after war, was BBC sports commentator

T
 Floyd James Thompson – America's longest-held POW, he spent 9 years in POW camps in Vietnam (1964 – 1973)
 Josip Broz Tito – president of Yugoslavia, Austrian soldier in WWI, captured by Russians in 1915
 András Toma – last known WWII POW, a Hungarian soldier who lived in a psychiatric asylum in Russia for 55 years before being identified and returned home in 2000
 Jakow Trachtenberg –Russian Jewish mathematician who developed the mental calculation techniques called the Trachtenberg system
 Mikhail Tukhachevsky – Soviet military leader and theorist, captured by Germans in WWI

U
 Charles Upham – most decorated Commonwealth soldier of WWII, awarded the Victoria Cross twice

V
 Arthur W. Vanaman - Major General, Chief-of-Staff for Intelligence for the Eighth Air Foce. Highest-ranked American POW in the European Theater during WWII.
 Laurens van der Post – South African writer and war hero, captured by Japanese forces in 1942
 Bram van der Stok - Dutch pilot of No. 41 Squadron RAF. Escapee #18 of the "Great Escape" from Stalag Luft III, successfully crossed Europe with help from the French Resistance to reach a British consulate in Spain
 Abhinandan Varthaman – Indian Air Force pilot, shot down and captured during Indo - Pak standoff in Feb 2019
 Dietrich von Choltitz – German general, military governor of Paris, POW in England 1944-45, then in American custody till 1947
 Walther von Seydlitz-Kurzbach – German general captured at Stalingrad
 Kurt Vonnegut – American writer; captured in the Battle of the Bulge and witnessed the bombing of Dresden

W
 Jonathan Wainwright – Commanding General US forces in Philippines; captured at Bataan (1942–1945)
 George Washington – first US President, captured in 1754 by the French during the French and Indian War

Z
 Louis Zamperini – American athlete, member of Olympic team, captured by Japanese forces in 1943

References 

List
Prisoners of war